Ntambirweki is a surname. Notable people with the surname include:

Barbara Ntambirweki (born 1981), Ugandan lawyer, academic, and activist 
John Ntambirweki (born 1955), Ugandan lawyer, academic, and academic administrator

Surnames of African origin